Henri Cohen may refer to:

Henri Cohen (composer) (1808–1880), French music theorist and composer
Henri Cohen (water polo) (died 1930), Belgian water polo athlete
Henri Cohen (number theorist) (born 1947), French mathematician

See also
Henry Cohen (disambiguation)